Richard Evans (9 September 1867 – 1 November 1939) was an Australian cricketer. He played one first-class match for South Australia in 1892/93.

See also
 List of South Australian representative cricketers

References

External links
 

1867 births
1939 deaths
Australian cricketers
South Australia cricketers
Cricketers from Adelaide